Richard Thomas Bryant (1935–July 7, 1990) was an American Professional Wrestler who was famous for his in-ring name of Chief Little Eagle. He was a prominent wrestler in the Georgia , Dallas and Tri-State Territories of NWA. He was a multi-time tag-team champion, having won various tag-team championships throughout the 50s and 60s along with his long-time partner Chief Big Heart. He was the single most popular Native American wrestler to ever appear in the Atlanta territory. Other notable partners include Dick Steinborn, Bill Dromo and WWE Hall of Famer Chief Jay Strongbow with whom he also won tag titles.

Professional Wrestling Career
Richard Thomas Bryant was born in Texas in 1935. Little Eagle made his professional wrestling debut in 1954 against Earl Fleming at a Dallas house show for the World Class Wrestling Association as Dick Bryant, which he ended in a time limit draw. After this initial match, he had to struggle for a few years till he got into a stable wrestling career. He wrestled sporadically for various NWA territories.

Around this time he also changed his gimmick to become Chief Little Eagle, a Cherokee Indian, even though he wasn't native American. In 1959, he reached the Georgia Championship Wrestling and teamed up with Chief Big Heart. Here, he was an instant success and went on to defeat the team of Andre Bollet and Frank Valois for the NWA Texas Tag Team Titles along with Big Heart on the 7th of April, 1959. They dropped the titles to Ben and Mike Sharpe just a week later. During this period, the Big Heart and Little Eagle team feuded with the likes of the Golden Grahams (Jerry and Eddie), the Tolos Brothers (Chris Tolos and John Tolos) and Johnny Valentine. After this Little Eagle continued to be a singles wrestler. He won his first singles championship, Tte NWA Southeastern Heavyweight Championship (Southern Division) after defeating, Dick Dunn (September 20, 1961). He held the championship until October 6, when he lost it to Greg Peterson.

In February 1961 he briefly won the Southern Heavyweight championship under unknown circumstances, but quickly lost it back to Skull Murphy. He also defeated Skull Murphy for the NWA Georgia Southern Heavyweight Championship, but it was not accepted anywhere, and thus Little Eagle was not considered an official champion. Shortly after this, he and Murphy had a match in Macon, Georgia to decide who's the real champion which Murphy won gaining statewide recognition. He also had a series of matches with Miguel Torres during this period in which they traded wins and losses. After this he went to Capitol wrestling Corporation where he teamed up with old partner Big Heart to challenge the team of Jerry Graham and Eddie Graham for the WWWF United States Tag Team Championship in a failing attempt.

After this loss, Eagle returned to Atlanta- based GCW. Here he was also a top booker under former professional wrestler and promoter Ray Gunkel for many years. In GCW he teamed with Dick Steinborn and challenged Lenny Montana and Tarzan Tyler for the NWA (Georgia) World Tag Team titles. They defeated them to win it on April 27, 1963. They held the titles for about a month and half before dropping it back to Montana and Tyler. After this he teamed up with Bill Dromo to challenge Lenny and Montana again and won the titles back at a GCW show. They lost the titles back to Ray Gunkel and Dick Steinborn. Gunkel and Steinborn were also the final champions as the championship would become defunct soon after.

After this he again teamed up with Big Heart went on to win the NWA World Tag Team Championship (Georgia version) when they defeated Tarzan Tyler and Lenny Montana for the titles at Municipal Auditorium in a November house show. They held the championship for about a month, until January 1964. The team of Chief and eagle lost the titles under unknown circumstances, after which the titles were next seen with The Von Brauners. After this Big Heart left for NWA Tri-State, while Eagle continued wrestling as a Tag Team competitor. He formed a new team with  WWE hall of famer and another American wrestler with a native American gimmick, Chief Jay Strongbow, the wrestling under his real name Joseph Scarpo and went on to defeat the team of The Corsicans (Corsica Jean & Corsica Joe) for the NWA (Georgia) Southern Tag Team titles at a house show on June 4, 1965. They lost the titles to Al and Mario Galento a week later. After this Little Eagle wrestled exclusively as a singles competitor. He went back to Gulf Coast Championship Wrestling and challenged Eduardo Perez for the NWA Gulf Coast Heavyweight title. He won the title on April 6, 1966. He held the championship for three months before dropping it to Ramon Torres.

After this he became the inaugural Panama City Heavyweight champion by defeating Ken Lucas and Eduardo Perez in a triple-threat match to become the first winner on 4 April 1966. But the title was deactivated shortly afterwards. The title would be reactivated 4 years later in 1970. During this time Eagle had a series of matches with Dick the bruiser in the Atlanta Territory, which ended in a no-contest. He also faced other popular heels such as Skaandor Akbar, The Assassins and Luke Graham. He continued to wrestle for the territory when till 1972 when he was injured at a house in Griffon, Georgia by the Assassins. This forced him into temporary retirement. He returned to wrestling briefly in 1974 in All-South Wrestling Alliance in 1974 when he won the ASWA Georgia Tag Team Championship along with Chief Bold Eagle. this was the last championship that Bryant ever won and soon lost it to the team of The Royal Kangaroos. He retired permanently after this.

Death
After retirement Bryant became a preacher and used to preach to anyone who will listen. On July 7, 1990 he took in a homeless man by the name of Dolph Adams. Unknown to him Dolph had previous criminal record and that night took out a gun and shot Bryant which severed his spinal cord and pierced his heart in the process killing him. Adams would eventually be convicted of murder and be arrested. Bryant was survived by his wife Venus LaRue who died in 2011 and his Brother Vince Bryant who died in 1998.

Championships and Accomplishment
Gulf Coast Championship Wrestling
NWA Gulf Coast Heavyweight Championship (2 times)
 Panama City Heavyweight Championship(1 time) 
World Class Wrestling Association
WCWA Texas Tag Team Championship (1 time) with - Chief Big Heart
Georgia Championship Wrestling
NWA Georgia Heavyweight Championship (1 time)
NWA International Tag Team Championship (Georgia version) (2 times) with - Dick Steinborn (1), Bill Dromo(1)
NWA World Tag Team Championship (Georgia version) (1 time) with - Chief Big Heart
NWA Southern Tag Team Championship (Georgia version) (1 time) with - Chief Jay Strongbow
All-South Wrestling Association
ASWA Georgia Tag Team Championship(1 time) with - Chief Bold Eagle

References

1935 births
1990 deaths
American wrestlers
People from Texas